Garner, Kentucky may refer to the following places in the U.S. state of Kentucky:
Garner, Boyd County, Kentucky
Garner, Knott County, Kentucky